Palair Macedonian Airlines Flight 301 was a scheduled international passenger flight to Switzerland's Zurich-Kloten Airport from Skopje International Airport, Skopje, which crashed shortly after takeoff on March 5, 1993. The Fokker 100 was operated by Palair, the then national airline of Macedonia (now North Macedonia). A total of 83 people, 79 passengers and 4 crew members, were killed in the crash while 14 people survived. At the time, it was the deadliest plane crash in the country.

The investigation of the disaster, which was assisted by the Dutch investigation team, concluded that the cause of the accident was loss of roll controllability due to the accumulation of ice on the wings of the aircraft. Also known as atmospheric icing, the ice accumulation caused the deterioration of lift force. Failure to adhere to the correct procedure for handling an atmospheric icing was also cited as one of the causes of the crash.

Aircraft
The aircraft involved in the accident was a Fokker 100 with a registration code of PH-KXL, with a serial number of 11393. The aircraft was new, built in 1992 and was sent to Palair on 27 January 1993. It had accrued a total of 188 flight hours and 136 flight cycles.

Passengers and crew
Flight 301 carried 92 passengers and 5 crew members. Most of the passengers were Kosovars who were going to work in Switzerland.

The flight was flown by members of Aircraft Financing and Trading (AFT), a company based in the Netherlands, based on a leased contract. Both pilots had the rank of captain. The pilot in command (pilot not flying (PNF), training captain) was 49-year-old Peter Bierdrager, a Dutch national. He had his last medical check in 1992 and had accrued a total flying experience of 11,200 hours, of which 1,180 hours were in the Fokker 100. Other than the Fokker 100 license, he had also obtained licenses for Fokker F-27, Fokker 28 and Fokker 50. The captain-under-training (pilot flying (PF) and acting captain) was an unnamed 34-year old Macedonian. He had a total flying experience of 5,580 hours, of which 65 hours were in the Fokker. Before he joined AFT, he was a pilot at the Yugoslav's JAT.

Flight
Flight 301 was an international scheduled passenger flight originating in Skopje, Macedonia, with a final destination of Zurich, Switzerland. 92 passengers and 5 crew members were on board the aircraft. The Fokker 100, registered as PH-KXL, belonged to Palair Macedonian Airlines, the then national airline of the country.
 
Takeoff clearance was given at 11:11 local time. Flight 301 became airborne 28 seconds after its takeoff clearance.

Just 2 seconds after taking off from Runway 34, the aircraft began to shake violently. The flight crew immediately applied ailerons and rudder input to correct the attitude of the aircraft. The autopilot cavalry chimed and the sink rate warning sounded.

The aircraft's right wing tip struck the ground beyond the end of the runway with an angle of 90 degrees. Flight 301 cartwheeled before crashing to the ground, with the fuselage breaking up into three pieces. The aircraft immediately exploded and burst into flames.
 
The first report of the crash was received from a United Nations Peacekeeper who heard the impact while he was walking towards the ramp. Helicopter rescue started shortly after the crash as a United Nations (UNPROFOR) helicopter pilot, stationed at Skopje Airport, was alerted by the impact sound and offered
his services. He then immediately flew to the crash site and rescued 7 survivors from the crash site. More emergency services fire fighting, police and hospital vehicles arrived soon after the first survivors were flown to the hospital from the airport. As many as 20 survivors, of whom 5 were in critical condition, were transported to the hospital in Skopje. However, 4 survivors would later be pronounced dead on arrival. Several others succumbed to their injuries. Remarkably, the only surviving crew member, a flight attendant, suffered only minor injuries.

Investigation

Weather
Weather data collected by investigators suggested that there was light to moderate snow prior and during the accident. Airport workers reported that the snow melted when it touched the ground. Prior to the accident, there was no visible snow on the runway, taxiway or apron. Investigators confirmed that it was a wet snow, that is, snow mixed with rain. The aircraft was exposed to wet snow and the temperature was lower than the freezing dew point, a conducive condition for an atmospheric icing.

Wing contamination
The aircraft had been checked for signs of snow and ice by ground crews prior to its takeoff. Statements collected by investigators suggest that the inspection concentrated on the right wing. Investigators noted that there was no evidence that the left wing had been inspected as comprehensively as the right one.

Estimation conducted by investigators showed that the aircraft had been exposed with light precipitation, which later increased to moderate, for 1 hour and 15 minutes, with an unspecified amount of thickness. Due to the prevailing weather condition, investigators believed that the aircraft's wing upper surface had been covered with a thin layer of snow and possibly frozen to the skin.

According to the ground crews, several people had touched the wing leading edge to detect ice. However, due to the height of the aircraft, only tall people were able to do this. They would also be only able to touch the leading edge near the wingtip; however, they would not be able to reach the wing upper surface right behind the leading edge. Further examination revealed that the aircraft had arrived in Skopje with a relatively large amount of fuel that had a very low temperature. This caused the wet snow, which was falling onto the surface of the wing, to freeze. This was later confirmed as inspection revealed that frosts had been detected under the fuel tanks.

However, even though the aircraft had been covered by snow, the Flight Station Engineer and the ground crew had only reported "wet of melted snow". Investigators stated that they possibly had suffered an illusion. As per the final report, investigators stated:

The wing upper surface temperature of the collector tank and main tank compartment 1 responded rapidly to the warmer fuel being added. In the test the maximum skin temperature remained below the temperature of the fuel in the fuel truck. But on Skopje airport the temperatures of the outside air, the aircraft and the fuel in the truck were not so far apart, only the residual fuel in the aircraft tanks was much colder. It is, therefore, conceivable that during and after refueling of Palair 301 the upper skin temperatures of the collector tank and main tank compartment 1 could have approached the fuel truck temperature closer than in the test

This warming effect due to the added fuel being well above 0° C could, according to the test result, remain during the time between the first and second refueling and again on the second refueling. For an observer this could create the impression that the snow was melting on the wing just like on the ground because of the nature of the snow and the (air) temperature and not because of some other effect. This would be an illusion, however, because the outer half of the wing tank could not benefit from this warming effect and would thus collect snow. The warming effect causing the snow to melt on the inboard wing part would anyhow soon disappear after the boosterpumps were switched on prior to engine start.

It was later confirmed that the ground crew had only checked the inner part of the wing and had not checked the outer part. As snow on the inner part of the wing melted, this would create an impression that there were no more snow left on the wing and that all snow had melted, including those on the outer wing, which is why investigators called this as an illusion.

Lack of attention to icing
During the aircraft's previous flight to Skopje, which was operated by the same crew, the weather was not in a snowy condition. Light snow was only encountered when the aircraft was approaching Skopje, and reports stated that the snowflakes immediately melted when it contacted an object. Due to this, the crew did not pay attention to the weather, exposed themselves minimally to the weather, and focused mainly on the cockpit instruments. Investigators stated that the crew might have thought that the weather wasn't a threat to the safety of the aircraft. The Flight Station Engineer also stated that the aircraft would not require a de-icing, as the snow was regarded as "harmless".

The airline's standard operating procedure stated that a pilot had to perform the outside preflight inspection of the aircraft. On this flight, however, this rule was not followed. Instead, the outside inspection was delegated to the Flight Station Engineer. The Flight Station Engineer was regarded as highly experienced, and thus the crew believed his words when he said that the aircraft did not need de-icing. Post-accident analysis of the weather data, however, suggests that the aircraft would have needed to be de-iced.

Recordings taken from the CVR show that the crew did not mention anything about the weather and that they apparently never realized that the weather might have caused their loss of control of the aircraft.

Conclusion
The investigation board "determined that impact with the ground in a steep right bank shortly after liftoff was caused by loss of roll controllability due to contamination of the wings with ice. This situation resulted from an omission to carry out spraying of the aircraft with deicing or anti-icing fluid in meteorological conditions conducive to icing, due to a lack of ice-awareness of the flight crew and the Flying Station Engineer. Contributing factors were a lack of common background and procedures in a difficult multi-sources operational environment."

See also

 List of accidents and incidents involving commercial aircraft
 List of aircraft accidents and incidents resulting in at least 50 fatalities
 Avioimpex Flight 110, a 1993 aviation disaster that took place in Macedonia

Similar incidents
 Air Ontario Flight 1363
 Air Florida Flight 90
 Air Algerie Flight 5017
 USAir Flight 405
 Bek Air Flight 2100

References

External links


Aviation accidents and incidents in 1993
Aviation accidents and incidents in North Macedonia
Accidents and incidents involving the Fokker 100
Airliner accidents and incidents caused by ice
Palair Macedonian Airlines accidents and incidents
1993 in the Republic of Macedonia
March 1993 events in Europe